Jones Island may refer to:

 Jones Island (South Australia)
 Jones Island, Milwaukee
 Jones Island State Park, in the San Juan Islands of Washington state
 Jones Island (Montana), an island in Montana
 Jones Island (Chemung River), in New York 
 Jones Tract (a.k.a. Lower and Upper Jones islands), in California